The Victoria three-toed earless skink (Hemiergis talbingoensis)  is a species of skink found in New South Wales and Victoria in Australia.

References

Hemiergis
Reptiles described in 1946
Taxa named by Stephen J. Copland